In Greek mythology, Lyrnessus was a town or city in Dardania (Asia minor), inhabited by Cilicians.  It was closely associated with the nearby Cilician Thebe. At the time of the Trojan War, it was said to have been ruled by a king named Euenus. His son Mynes' widow is Briseis, who became a prize of Achilles.

See also 

 Ancient sites of Balıkesir

Note

References 
Trojans
Locations in Greek mythology
Locations in the Iliad

 Homer, The Iliad with an English Translation by A.T. Murray, Ph.D. in two volumes. Cambridge, MA., Harvard University Press; London, William Heinemann, Ltd. 1924. . Online version at the Perseus Digital Library.
 Homer, Homeri Opera in five volumes. Oxford, Oxford University Press. 1920. . Greek text available at the Perseus Digital Library.